Luca Trapani (1664–1719) was a Roman Catholic prelate who served as Bishop of Tricarico (1718–1719) and Bishop of Ischia (1698–1718).

Biography
Luca Trapani was born on 26 Mar 1664 in Naples, Italy and successively ordained a deacon on 24 Feb 1687 and a priest on 2 Mar 1687.
On 22 Dec 1698, he was appointed during the papacy of Pope Innocent XII as Bishop of Ischia.
On 28 Dec 1698, he was consecrated bishop by Pier Matteo Petrucci, Cardinal-Priest of San Marcello al Corso, with Tommaso Guzzoni, Bishop of Sora, and Domenico Belisario de Bellis, Bishop of Molfetta, serving as co-consecrators. 
On 24 Jan 1718, he was appointed during the papacy of Pope Clement XI as Bishop of Tricarico.
He served as Bishop of Tricarico until his death in September 1719.

While bishop, he was the principal co-consecrator of Antonio Sellent, Titular Bishop of Adraa and Auxiliary Bishop of Cagliari (1713).

References

External links and additional sources
 (for Chronology of Bishops) 
 (for Chronology of Bishops) 
 (for Chronology of Bishops) 
 (for Chronology of Bishops) 

17th-century Italian Roman Catholic bishops
18th-century Italian Roman Catholic bishops
Bishops appointed by Pope Innocent XII
Bishops appointed by Pope Clement XI
1664 births
1719 deaths
17th-century Neapolitan people
18th-century Neapolitan people